Thomas Lansing Masson (1866–1934) was an American anthropologist, editor and author.

Biography
He was born at Essex, Connecticut, and educated in the public schools of New Haven. He became literary editor of Life in 1893 and a regular contributor of humorous articles to various magazines. As an editor, he was responsible for Humorous Masterpieces of American Literature (1904); The Humor of Love in Verse and Prose (1906); The Best Stories in the World (1914).

Publications
 (1898). The Yankee Navy.
 (1904). In Marry Measure.
 (1905). A Corner in Women and Other Follies.
 (1905). Mary's Little Lamb.
 (1906). The Von Blumers. 
 (1907). A Bachelor's Baby and Some Grown-Ups.
 (1908). The New Plato.
 (1913). Mr. Rum.
 (1921). Well, Why Not?.
 (1922). Listen to These.
 (1923). That Silver Lining.
 (1925). Why I Am a Spiritual Vagabond.
 (1927). The City of Perfection.
 (1932). Within.

Selected articles
 (1922). "Shall we be Wrecked by Realism," The World's Work 43, pp. 435–439.
 (1922). "Teaching Children to Teach Themselves," The World's Work 44, pp. 410–414.

References

External links

 
 Works by Thomas Lansing Masson, at Hathi Trust
 
 Works by Thomas Lansing Masson, at JSTOR
 

1866 births
1934 deaths
American anthropologists
American humorists
American male journalists
American male novelists
Novelists from Connecticut
Writers from New Haven, Connecticut
People from Essex, Connecticut